Capalbio Scalo is a village in Tuscany, central Italy, administratively a frazione of the comune of Capalbio, province of Grosseto. It had a population of 551 as of 2011.

Geography 
Capalbio Scalo is about 50 km from Grosseto and 9 km from Capalbio. It is in the plain of southern Maremma between the hills of Capalbio and the Tyrrhenian Sea.  Capalbio Scalo lies on the shore of Lago di Burano, an important natural reserve.

Main sights 
 Church of Santa Maria Goretti (20th century) is the main parish church of the village. It was built in 1986 and consecrated by bishop Eugenio Binini.
 Tower of Buranaccio (16th century), built by the State of Presidi, is on the shore of the Burano Lake.
 Tower of Macchiatonda (17th century), coastal defense tower built by the State of Presidi, was restructured during the 19th century. It was used as a location in the 1969 movie The Seed of Man by director Marco Ferreri.

Transport 
Capalbio Scalo is located along the Via Aurelia highway which links Grosseto to Rome. It is served by the Tirrenica railway line thanks to its own station.

Bibliography 
 Fabiola Favilli, Capalbio. Alla scoperta del borgo e del territorio, Arcidosso, C&P Adver Effigi, 2011.

See also 
 Borgo Carige
 Chiarone Scalo
 Giardino, Capalbio
 La Torba
 Pescia Fiorentina

Frazioni of Capalbio
Railway towns in Italy